Colobeutrypanus is a genus of beetle in the family Cerambycidae, with two species, both from the Neotropical region The species are C. ornatus Tippmann, 1953 and C. barclayi Monné & Monné, 2012.

References

Acanthocinini